Suara Muhammadiyah ("Voice of the Muhammadiyah") is a magazine published by Muhammadiyah, an Islamic organization in Indonesia. It has been published continuously since 1916, making it one of the oldest publications in Indonesia.

References

External links 
 

Indonesian-language magazines
Magazines published in Indonesia
Magazines established in 1916
Islam-related literature
Islamic magazines